Julius Butty is a Canadian record producer. From 2004 thru 2016, he was the owner/producer of Silo Recording Studio. In late 2016, he began work on his new recording studio and in August 2018 ARC Recording Studio opened in Hamilton, Ontario.

Production credits 
 Kristin Nicholls Band 
 Alexisonfire
 The Gorgeous
 Sleeper Set Sail
 Hypodust
 Dear Jane, I...
 Navy
 Kobra and the Lotus
 Senate
 Haddonfield
 A Day and Deathwish
 Ceremonial Snips
 Rise Over Run
 Jude the Obscure
 Murder Thy Maker
 Don't Tell Sarah
 Sumo Cyco
 City and Colour
 Protest the Hero
 Callahan
 Marcio Novelli
 Varga
 Hunter Valentine
 Pacific Estate 
 Sarasin

References

External links
 Production credits on AllMusic
 Production credits on Discogs
 ARC Recording Studio

Canadian record producers
Living people
Year of birth missing (living people)
Place of birth missing (living people)